Cristian Alberto Tula (born 28 January 1978) is an Argentine football defender who last played for Independiente in the Argentine Primera División.

Career

Tula started his career with Ferro Carril Oeste in 1998 but in 2000 the club were relegated from the Primera, and the season after they were relegated again to the 3rd division. In 2003 they won the 3rd division title and Tula was signed by Argentine giants River Plate. In 2004, he was part of the River Plate squad that won the Clausura title.

In 2005 Tula had a loan spell with Arsenal de Sarandí before returning to River. In 2006 River sold Tula to San Lorenzo de Almagro where he has established himself as a first team regular. After a season on loan back at Arsenal, Tula returned to San Lorenzo for the 2010–11 season.

Honours

References

External links
 
 Argentine Primera statistics  

1978 births
Living people
People from Rawson, Chubut
Argentine footballers
Association football defenders
Argentine Primera División players
Primera B Metropolitana players
Categoría Primera A players
Ferro Carril Oeste footballers
Club Atlético River Plate footballers
Arsenal de Sarandí footballers
San Lorenzo de Almagro footballers
Atlético Nacional footballers
Argentine expatriate footballers
Expatriate footballers in Colombia
Argentine expatriate sportspeople in Colombia